North Lemmon is an unincorporated community in Adams County, North Dakota, United States. A local landowner, George E. Lemmon, is the town's namesake.

History
The community was a station along the Milwaukee Railroad, now served by the BNSF Railway.

Geography
North Lemmon is located at  (45.946112,-102.1576533), just across the South Dakota border from the city of Lemmon. North Lemmon is actually an extension of Lemmon, and includes all of the community that lies in North Dakota. North Lemmon was part of North Lemmon Township, until the township dissolved in 1999. North Lemmon is now included in the Census-designated East Adams Unorganized Territory.

Demographics
The United States Census Bureau does not provide specific population or other demographic information. North Lemmon Township returned a population of 81 as of the 1990 Census, with an estimated population of 66 when the township dissolved in 1999.

References

Unincorporated communities in Adams County, North Dakota
Unincorporated communities in North Dakota